Gedenkbibliothek (English: Memorial Library) may refer to:

 Amerika-Gedenkbibliothek (American Memorial Library)
 Gedenkbibliothek zu Ehren der Opfer des Kommunismus (Memorial Library in honour of the victims of Communism)

See also
 Presidential library